The bathing machine was a device, popular from the 18th century until the early 20th century, to allow people to change out of their usual clothes, change into swimwear, and wade in the ocean at beaches. Bathing machines were roofed and walled wooden carts rolled into the sea. Some had solid wooden walls, others canvas walls over a wooden frame, and commonly walls at the sides and curtained doors at each end.

The use of bathing machines as part of the etiquette for sea-bathing was to be observed by both men and women who wished to behave "respectably."

Especially in Britain, men and women were usually segregated, so that people of the opposite sex should not see them in their bathing suits, which (although extremely modest by modern standards) were not considered proper clothing in which to be seen in public.

Use

The bathing machines in use in Margate, Kent, were described by Walley Chamberlain Oulton in 1805 as:

People entered the small room of the machine while it was on the beach, wearing their street clothing. In the machine they changed into their bathing suit, although men were allowed to bathe nude until the 1860s, placing their street clothes into a raised compartment where they would remain dry.

Probably all bathing machines had small windows, but one writer in the Manchester Guardian of May 26, 1906 considered them "ill-lighted" and wondered why bathing machines were not improved with a skylight.
The machine would then be wheeled or slid into the water. The most common machines had large wide wheels and were propelled in and out of the surf by a horse or a pair of horses with a driver. Less common were machines pushed in and out of the water by human power. Some resorts had wooden rails into the water for the wheels to roll on; a few had bathing machines pulled in and out by cables propelled by a steam engine.

Once in the water, the occupants disembarked from the sea side down steps into the water. Many machines had doors front and back; those with only one door would be backed into the sea or need to be turned around. It was considered essential that the machine blocked any view of the bather from the shore. Some machines were equipped with a canvas tent lowered from the seaside door, sometimes capable of being lowered to the water, giving the bather greater privacy.
Some resorts employed a dipper, a strong person of the same sex who would assist the bather in and out of the sea. Some dippers were said to push bathers into the water, then yank them out, considered part of the experience.

Bathing machines would often be equipped with a small flag which could be raised by the bather as a signal to the driver that they were ready to return to shore.

History
According to some sources, the bathing machine was developed in 1750 in Margate, Kent. This version was probably intended to conceal the user until they were concealed by being in the water, as bathing costumes were not yet common and most people at the time bathed nude. "Mr. Benjamin Beale, a Quaker, was the inventor of the Bath Machine. Their structure is simple, but quite convenient; and by means of the umbrella, the pleasures of bathing may be enjoyed in so private a manner, as to be consistent with the strictest delicacy." In the Scarborough Public Library, there is an engraving by John Setterington dated 1736 which shows people bathing and is popularly believed to be first evidence for bathing machines; however Devon claims this was a year earlier in 1735.

Bathing machines were most common in the United Kingdom and parts of the British Empire with a British population, but were also used in France, Germany, the United States, Mexico, and other nations. Prince Albert used one at Osborne Beach near Osborne House on the Isle of Wight as did Queen Victoria who used it to sketch and for bathing; she wrote about such an experience in her diary in July 1847. After the monarch's death, her machine was used as a chicken coop, but it was restored in the 1950s and put on display in 2012. According to a news report, "The queen's bathing machine was unusually ornate, with a front verandah and curtains which would conceal her until she had entered the water. The interior had a changing room and a plumbed-in WC".

Legal segregation of bathing areas in Britain ended in 1901, and the bathing machine declined rapidly. By the start of the 1920s, bathing machines were almost extinct, even on beaches catering to an older clientele.

The bathing machines remained in active use on English beaches until the 1890s, when they began to be parked on the beach. They were then used as stationary changing rooms for a number of years. Most of them had disappeared in the United Kingdom by 1914.

However, in Aldeburgh, Suffolk, Eric Ravilious was able to paint bathing machines on wheels with winches still in use as late as 1938. In many places around the world they have survived to this day as stationary bathing boxes.

In fiction
 In The Hunting of the Snark a Snark's fondness for bathing machines is listed as the fourth "unmistakable mark" that Snark hunters should consider.
 In Iolanthe, the Lord Chancellor's "Nightmare Song" describes a passenger ship as not much larger than a bathing machine.
 The use of the bathing machine and segregated swimming is depicted in the ITV series Sanditon, based on the unfinished novel of the same name by Jane Austen.
 In Persuasion by Jane Austen, the principal street in the town of Lyme is said to be “animated with bathing machines” during the season.
In Vanity Fair (1847–48) by William Makepeace Thackeray, chapter 22, after Amelia Sedley and George Osborne's wedding: "Some ten days after the above ceremony, three young men of our acquaintance were enjoying that beautiful prospect of bow windows on the one side and blue sea on the other, which Brighton affords to the traveller. Sometimes it is towards the ocean - smiling with countless dimples, speckled with white sails, with a hundred bathing-machines kissing the skirt of his blue garment - that the Londoner looks enraptured (...)"
 In Devil In Spring by Lisa Kleypas, “Serapfina led her to a bathing-machine that had been left near a dune. It was a small enclosed room set on high wheels, with a set of steps leading up to the door.”
The bathing machine is referenced in The Woman in White by Wilkie Collins.
The 2020 film Ammonite depicts Charlotte Murchison using a bathing machine.

See also
Beach hut
Victorian morality

References

Further reading
Ferry, Kathryn. Beach Huts and Bathing Machines, Shire Publications, 2009. 
 Schaefer, Mary & David. Where Did You Change?, Mica Publishers, 2006.

External links

 Bathing machines at Flickr Commons
 Martha Gunn page about a professional dipper, with an illustration of a row of bathing machines employing dippers.

Swimming
Victorian era